Curling is a team sport that is contested at the Winter Olympic Games. A men's tournament was held at the 1924 Winter Olympics before the sport was removed from the official programme until the 1998 Games. For 82 years, the 1924 tournament was considered a demonstration sport, so the medals were not officially counted by the International Olympic Committee (IOC). The tournament was won by a team from the Royal Caledonian Curling Club in Scotland, who represented Great Britain. In 2006, Scottish newspaper The Herald conducted an investigation that found evidence that curling had been part of the official programme. The IOC subsequently recognized the top three teams as full medal winners.

Although not part of the official programme, curling was contested as a demonstration sport in 1932, 1988 and 1992. Curling was re-added as a demonstration event in 1988 because the Olympics were being held in Calgary, Alberta, Canada, where the sport has a strong following. In November 1992, the Nagano Winter Olympic Organizing Committee and IOC Coordination Committee reached an agreement to include curling in the official programme of the 1998 Games in Nagano, Japan. Both the men's and women's tournaments have been held at every Winter Olympics since.

In total, 132 athletes have won a medal in curling, and 11 have won two. In 2010, Anette Norberg, Eva Lund, Cathrine Lindahl and Anna Le Moine of Sweden won the gold medal in the women's tournament, becoming the first curlers to win consecutive gold medals. Kaitlyn Lawes, John Morris (two gold), and Kevin Martin of Canada (one gold, one silver), Torger Nergård of Norway (one gold, one silver), John Shuster and Joe Polo of the United States (one gold, one bronze), and Mirjam Ott of Switzerland (two silver) have also won two medals. Norberg also won a silver in 1988 when curling was a demonstration sport. According to the IOC, Carl August Kronlund of Sweden was the oldest Winter Olympics medallist, winning silver in 1924 at the age of 59. Robin Welsh of Great Britain was the oldest Winter Olympics gold medallist, winning in 1924 when he was 54.

Teams from Canada have been successful in the sport since its return to the programme, winning two medals at each Olympics for a total of five gold, three silver and two bronze. Switzerland is the only other nation to win at least one medal at every Olympics since 1998 with one gold, two silver and one bronze. Teams from Norway, Sweden, Great Britain, and the United States have also won gold medals in the sport. A total of 27 medals (nine of each color) have been awarded since 1924 and have been won by teams from ten National Olympic Committees (NOC).



Medalists

Men

Medals:

Women

Medals:

Mixed doubles

Medals:

Notes
  The members of the 1924 British team vary depending on the source. William Jackson, Robin Welsh,  Thomas Murray and Laurence Jackson are listed as the medallists by the British Olympic Association and International Society of Olympic Historians. The Herald reports that those four are the only British curlers that played, and they received gold medals and certificates. However, the IOC database omits Laurence Jackson and includes T. Aikman, D. G. Astley, W. Brown, R. Cousin and J. McLeod. According to The Herald, the IOC believes that those five also received medals. The World Curling Federation's list agrees with the BOA, but also lists John T. Robertson Aikman [incorrectly] as an alternate.

Athlete medal leaders

See also
List of Paralympic medalists in wheelchair curling
List of World Men's Curling Champions
List of World Women's Curling Champions
List of World Mixed Doubles Curling Champions

References

Specific

General

External links
 Curling – Olympics at Sports-reference.com
 Olympic Review and Revue Olympique. LA84 Foundation

Curling
medalists
 
Olympic
Olympic medalists